Paul John "P. J." Hogan (born 30 November 1962) is an AACTA Award-winning Australian film director and writer.

Early life
Hogan was born in Brisbane, Queensland. As a teenager, he lived on the North Coast of New South Wales and attended Mt St Patrick's College. He was said to have had a difficult time in high school as he was a victim of bullying. His film Mental is based upon his difficult adolescent years.

Career
Hogan's directorial debut was the short film Getting Wet, made in 1984. This film won him an AACTA Award for Best Short Fiction Film. He then went on to direct minor films. In 1991, he was the assistant director of the Australian film Proof. In the early 1990s, he wrote for several television series, including The Flying Doctors in 1991 and for Lift Off in 1992.

Hogan's first big hit was the 1994 Australian film Muriel's Wedding, which helped launch the careers of actors Toni Collette and Rachel Griffiths. He both wrote and directed this film, and was nominated for Best Director at the AACTA Awards. The success of the film also led him to be chosen by Julia Roberts to direct his 1997 American debut My Best Friend's Wedding, which also starred Cameron Diaz and Dermot Mulroney.

Hogan followed this with the comedy Unconditional Love (which was filmed in 1999 but not released until 2003), and 2003's big budget adaptation of Peter Pan, starring Jason Isaacs as Captain Hook, Jeremy Sumpter as Peter Pan and Rachel Hurd-Wood as Wendy. Despite positive reviews, the 2003 Peter Pan film failed at the box office. The following year he directed a pilot for a remake of the cult soap opera Dark Shadows, which was not picked up for broadcast, and created the story for the 2008 musical film The American Mall. He then directed Confessions of a Shopaholic (starring Isla Fisher), an adaptation of the novel The Secret Dreamworld of a Shopaholic. In 1999, both Hogan and Moorhouse through Hogan Moorhouse Pictures signed a first look deal with Sony.

In 2012, he reunited with Muriel star Collette for the comedy Mental. Hogan will direct an adaptation of Blue Balliett's book Chasing Vermeer.

Personal life
Hogan is married to film director Jocelyn Moorhouse. They have four children, two of whom are autistic.

In April 2019, Moorhouse spoke on the ABC Television program Australian Story about how their relationship had developed and how having the children had affected their personal and professional lives, including a move back to Australia from the US.

Filmography

Film

Television

References

External links

1962 births
Australian film directors
Australian screenwriters
Living people
People from Brisbane
English-language film directors